Yankee Flats is a ghost town located in the Okanagan region of British Columbia.  The town is situated on the west side of the Salmon River.

References

Ghost towns in British Columbia